Wald is a village and a municipality in the district of Hinwil in the canton of Zürich in Switzerland.

History

Wald is mentioned for the first time in a document from 1217. In the year 1621 the municipality received market rights.

During the process of industrialization it had numerous spinning mills and weaving mills.

Geography
Of this area, 53.9% is used for agricultural purposes, while 33.4% is forested. Of the rest of the land, 12% is settled (buildings or roads) and the remainder (0.8%) is non-productive (rivers, glaciers or mountains).   housing and buildings made up 8% of the total area, while transportation infrastructure made up the rest (4.1%). Of the total unproductive area, water (streams and lakes) made up 0.2% of the area.   8.6% of the total municipal area was undergoing some type of construction.

Demographics
, 23.5% of the population was made up of foreign nationals.   the gender distribution of the population was 50% male and 50% female. Over the last 10 years the population has grown at a rate of 6.9%. Most of the population speaks German  (83.9%), with Italian being second most common ( 5.2%) and Serbo-Croatian being third ( 2.8%).

In the 2007 election the most popular party was the SVP which received 41.5% of the vote.  The next three most popular parties were the SPS (15.3%), the Green Party (11.3%) and the FDP (9.7%).

The age distribution of the population is children and teenagers (0–19 years old) make up 26.2% of the population, while adults (20–64 years old) make up 57.6% and seniors (over 64 years old) make up 16.2%.  In Wald about 65.2% of the population (between age 25-64) have completed either non-mandatory upper secondary education or additional higher education (either university or a Fachhochschule).  There are 3369 households in Wald.

Wald has an unemployment rate of 2.46%.  , there were 235 people employed in the primary economic sector and about 98 businesses involved in this sector.  959 people are employed in the secondary sector and there are 113 businesses in this sector.  1806 people are employed in the tertiary sector, with 269 businesses in this sector.   45.5% of the working population were employed full-time, and 54.5% were employed part-time.

 there were 2779 Catholics and 3377 Protestants in Wald. From the 2000 census, 43.9% were some type of Protestant, with 41.2% belonging to the Swiss Reformed Church and 2.7% belonging to other Protestant churches.  32.6% of the population were Catholic. Of the rest of the population, 0% were Muslim, 10.5% belonged to another religion (not listed), 4.2% did not give a religion, and 8.4% were atheist or agnostic.

Transportation 
Wald railway station is a stop of the Zürich S-Bahn on the lines S26.

Gallery

References

External links 

  

Municipalities of the canton of Zürich